The 2007–08 Women's National Cricket League season was the 12th season of the Women's National Cricket League, the women's domestic limited overs cricket competition in Australia. The tournament started on 17 November 2007 and finished on 19 January 2008. The final between defending champions New South Wales Breakers and South Australian Scorpions was washed out, and as such the Breakers won the tournament for the 10th time by virtue of topping the ladder at the conclusion of the group stage.

Ladder

Fixtures

Final

Statistics

Highest totals

Most runs

Most wickets

References

External links
 Series home at ESPNcricinfo

 
Women's National Cricket League seasons
 
Women's National Cricket League